Two-Boys Gumede (born 23 August 1985 in Durban) is a South African soccer player who currently plays for River City Rovers in the USL Premier Development League.

Early life
Gumede was the second boy in his family, leading his mother to suggest she had "Two Boys".

He spent his early life in Tongaat (now oThongathi) a town near Durban, before moving to Johannesburg as a teenager to play soccer in a junior development team. While touring with the team in the United States he was offered the opportunity to join an exchange program. He moved to the United States in 2001 as an exchange student, joining a host family in Louisville, Kentucky. He attended Walden School, becoming the first member of his family to graduate high school.

Playing career
He played for the Javanon Soccer Club, helping them to the 2003 Kentucky state club championship.

College and amateur
In 2005 Gumede began playing college soccer at the University of Alabama at Birmingham.

At UAB he was named to the Conference USA All-Freshman Team in 2005, earned second-team all-conference accolades as a sophomore in 2006, first team all-region and all-conference accolades in 2007 after redshirting his junior season when visa troubles kept him from returning to the United States after a visit to South Africa. He was named to the 2009 Hermann Trophy watchlist prior to his senior season in 2009.

During his college years Gumede played with the Panama City Pirates in the USL Premier Development League.

Professional
Having trained with Major League Soccer club D.C. United during the early part of 2010 Gumede was expected to be a prominent pick at the 2010 MLS SuperDraft, but was not selected by any team, due to an injury. He signed his first professional contract in 2010 when he was signed by the NSC Minnesota Stars of the USSF Division 2 Professional League.

He made his professional debut on 28 April 2010 in a game against the Rochester Rhinos.

References

External links
 UAB profile

1985 births
Living people
Sportspeople from Durban
Zulu people
South African soccer players
Panama City Beach Pirates players
Minnesota United FC (2010–2016) players
Derby City Rovers players
USL League Two players
UAB Blazers men's soccer players
South African expatriates in the United States
USSF Division 2 Professional League players
Association football forwards
Association football midfielders